Boi Bazaar-Kashmir Point, also called the Kashmiri Bazaar, is a popular bazaar at the border of Kashmir and Boi, Abbottabad district, Pakistan. In operation for almost 100 years, the bazaar is known for walnuts, expensive herbal plants and wood carvings. Thousands of traders arriving from Balakot have opened outlets in the bazaar.
Kashmir
Abbottabad District